Golyamo Belovo is a village in Southern Bulgaria. It is located in the Pazardzhik Province. It is part of Belovo Municipality.

References

 Belovo
 The town of Belovo

Villages in Pazardzhik Province